Exile is either an entity who is, or the state of being, away from one's home while being explicitly refused permission to return.

Exile, exiled,  exiles, The Exile, or The Exiles may also refer to:

Exiles
 Babylonian captivity, or Babylonian exile of the 6th century B.C., during which a number of people were deported from the Kingdom of Judah to Babylon 
 Cuban exile, the large exodus of Cubans since the 1959 Cuban Revolution
 Francoism, or the exile of Republicans in Spain, the large number of people who fled from Spain to other countries (France, Mexico, the United States) during the regime of Francisco Franco
 Malta exiles, men of politics, high rank soldiers, administrators and intellectuals of the Ottoman Empire who were sent to exile in Malta
 Marian exiles, more than 800 English Protestants who mostly fled to Germany, Switzerland, and France and joined with reformed churches
 Project Exile, a controversial federal program started in Richmond, Virginia in 1997
 Tax exile, one who chooses to leave their native country and instead to domicile themselves in a foreign nation where taxes are lower or nil
 Sürgünlik, 'exile' the forced population transfer, ethnic cleansing and genocide of ] Crimean Tatars carried out by the Soviet authorities

People with the name
 Exile (producer), American hip hop producer
 Tim Exile, British electronic musician

Books
 Exile (Deeping novel) (1930), by Warwick Deeping
 Exile (Forgotten Realms novel) (1990), a novel in The Dark Elf Trilogy written by R. A. Salvatore
 Exile (Patterson novel) (2007), by Richard North Patterson
 Exile (Star Wars novel) (2007), by Aaron Allston, the fourth book in the Legacy of the Force series
 Exile, the English title of Deoraíocht (1910), by Pádraic Ó Conaire
Exiles, a 2022 murder mystery novel by Jane Harper
Exiles trilogy, a fantasy novel series by author Melanie Rawn
 The Exile (Buck book), a biography by Pearl S. Buck about her Presbyterian missionary father, Absalom Sydenstricker
 The Exile: Sex, Drugs, and Libel in the New Russia, a 2000 memoir by Matt Taibbi and Mark Ames
 The Exile, a 2004 novel by Allan Folsom
 The Exile, a 1987 novel by William Kotzwinkle in which a famous actor in Los Angeles becomes a Nazi during World War II
 The Exile: The Flight of Osama bin Laden, a 2017 book by Adrian Levy and Cathy Scott-Clark
 "The Exiles" (Bradbury story), a 1949 science fiction short story by author Ray Bradbury
The Exiles (Harper novel), a 2023 novel by Jane Harper
 "The Exiles", a story by Horacio Quiroga
 The Exile, a WWII fortnightly camp magazine in Changi Prison with contributions by Ronald Searle and George Sprod
 The Exiles, a novel and series by Hilary McKay

Periodicals
 The Exile, a short-lived literary magazine published by Ezra Pound
 The eXile, a biweekly English language newspaper published in Moscow

Plays and audiodrama
 Exile (audio drama), in Doctor Who
 Exiles (play), a 1918 play by James Joyce

Comics
 Exile, the fourteenth book of the series Guardians of Ga'Hoole by Kathryn Lasky
 Exiles (Malibu Comics), one of two series published in 1993 and 1995 by Malibu Comics
 Exiles (Marvel Comics), a Marvel Comics superhero team
 Exiles (comic book), a series published by Marvel Comics starting in 2001

Fictional entities
 Exile (Last Exile), space ship in the anime series Last Exile
 Exile (Road Rovers), a fictional anthropomorphic Siberian Husky from the Warner Bros. cartoon Road Rovers
 Exiles (Middle-earth), the Noldor in J. R. R. Tolkien's Middle-earth legendarium who left under Fëanor and Fingolfin
 Jedi Exile, the main character in the PC/Xbox videogame Star Wars: Knights of the Old Republic II: The Sith Lords

Film and TV

Films
Exile (1917 film) , an American silent drama film
 Exile (1994 film), an Australian film
Exile (2013 film), a film by Charles-Olivier Michaud
 Exile (2016 film), a film by Rithy Panh
 Exile (2020 film), a Kosovan film
Exiled (2006), a film by Johnnie To
 Exiled: A Law & Order Movie (1998), a television movie based on the television series Law & Order
 Exils (2004), a film by Tony Gatlif
 The Exile (1914 film), a Hungarian film
 The Exile (1922 film), a Soviet Georgian film
 The Exile (1931 film), directed by Oscar Micheaux
 The Exile (1947 film), directed by Max Ophüls
 The Exiles (1923 film), directed by Edmund Mortimer
 The Exiles (1961 film), a documentary by Kent MacKenzie

Television 
 Exile (TV series), a 2011 psychological thriller TV series from BBC
 Exiled (TV series), a spinoff series of the MTV reality show My Super Sweet 16
 The Exile (TV series), an American television series
 The Exiles, a cycle of four plays written for television by Lynn Foster

Episodes
 "Exile" (Casualty), a 2015 episode of the BBC series Casualty
 "Exile" (Smallville), a 2003 episode of the WB series Smallville
 "Exile" (Star Trek: Enterprise), a 2003 episode of Star Trek: Enterprise
 "Exile", a second-to-last episode of  The Dead Zone
 "Exile", a 2018 episode of Law and Order: SVU

Games
 Exile (1988 video game), a space-based computer game
 Exile (1988 video game series) (1988, 1991, 1993), a Sega Genesis and Turbo CD console game trilogy set during the time of the Crusades
 Exile (1995 video game series) (1995, 1996, 1997), a series of shareware computer role-playing games for Microsoft Windows and Mac OS
 Myst III: Exile (2001), the third installment of the Myst computer game series

Music

Classical
 "Exile", a Russian art song composed by Georgy Sviridov

Groups
 Exile (American band), an American country band
 Exile (Japanese band), a Japanese pop music group

Albums
 Exile (Aloud album), 2010
 Exile (Anorexia Nervosa album), 1997
 Exile (Gary Numan album), 1997
 Exile (Geoffrey Oryema album), 1990
 Exile (Hurts album), 2013
 Exile (Steve Reynolds album), 2006
 Exile, a 2012 album by To-Mera
 Exhile, a 2007 album by Sole
 Exiles (Dan Fogelberg album), 1987
 Exiles (Max Richter album), 2021
 Exile (Demon Hunter album), 2022

Songs
 "Exile" (song), a 2020 song by Taylor Swift
 "Exile", by Enya from the album Watermark, 1988
 "Exile", by Geoffrey Oryema from the album Exile, 1990
 "Exile", by Gary Numan from the album Exile, 1997
 "Exile", by Slayer from the album God Hates Us All, 2001
 "Exile", by Soilwork from the album Sworn to a Great Divide, 2007
 "Exile", by Hurts from the album Exile, 2013
 "Exiles", by King Crimson from the album Larks' Tongues in Aspic, 1973
 "Exiles", by Dan Fogelberg from the album Exiles, 1987

Brands and enterprises
 Exile Studios (see: Hollow Earth Expedition), a role-playing game company
 Exiles Bookshop, a Sydney bookshop which hosted many poetry readings

Sports
Exiles rugby league team, an international rugby league team
 Exiles, a name used for an Other Nationalities rugby league team, comprising European based Australian, New Zealand, and Pacific Island players
 The Exiles, a frequently used nickname for London Irish RFC, an English rugby union club
 The Exiles, a nickname of Newport County A.F.C., a Welsh football club

Other uses
 Exile, Wisconsin
 Exile (moth) (Apamea zeta ssp. marmorata)
 Ex-ile, a set of games on the 2014 reality TV show The Challenge: Battle of the Exes II

See also
 X Isle (2009 novel) a young adult novel by Steve Augarde
 In Exile (disambiguation)